Shipley is a small hamlet village in the state of New South Wales, Australia, in the City of Blue Mountains. It is an unbounded locality within the locality of Blackheath, south-west of the township of Blackheath. The Shipley Plateau, on which the village is built, divides the Megalong Valley and Kanimbla Valley.

References

Towns in New South Wales
Suburbs of the City of Blue Mountains